The Bell-Irving volcanic district is a volcanic field in the upper Bell-Irving River watershed of northern British Columbia, Canada. It is considered part of the Northern Cordilleran Volcanic Province, consisting of 14 volcanic centres. They comprise pillow lava and/or volcaniclastic rocks, which were possibly emplaced by alpine glaciovolcanic eruptions during the Pleistocene. The volcanic deposits were discovered between 1992 and 2004 but remained undescribed until 2006.

Occurrences
The Bell-Irving volcanic district includes the following:

Adzich volcanic centre
Owl Creek South volcanic deposits
Owl Creek North volcanic deposits
Rochester Creek Southwest volcanic centre
Rochester Creek Southeast volcanic centre
Upper Rochester Creek volcanic deposits
Rochester Creek Northeast-South volcanic deposits
Rochester Creek Northeast-North volcanic deposits
Bell-Irving River East South volcanic deposit
Bell-Irving River East North volcanic deposit
Bell-Irving River volcanic centre
Bell-Irving Northeast volcanic deposits
Icefield Ridge volcanic deposit
Craven Lake volcanic centre

References

Pleistocene volcanism
Northern Cordilleran Volcanic Province
Volcanic fields of Canada